Sati Tulasi (English: Ever-Present Tulasi) (Telugu: సతీ తులసి) is a 1936 Telugu film directed by Chitrapu Narasimha Rao.

Plot
The Hindu Mythological story is based on the life of pious Tulasi and Jalandhara and how she won the affection of Lord Vishnu. Veteran actor Vemuri Gaggaiah played the role of Jalandhara whereas the title role of Tulasi was played by Sriranjani

External links
 

1936 films
1930s Telugu-language films
Films about Hinduism
Indian musical drama films
Indian black-and-white films
1930s musical drama films
1936 drama films